Hewson Consultants were one of the smaller software companies which produced video games for home computers in the mid-1980s. They had a reputation for high-quality games which continually pushed the boundaries of what the computers were capable of and can be compared favourably with other ground-breaking software houses like Ultimate Play the Game and Beyond.  Fourteen of their games were awarded "Megagame" by Your Sinclair.

Hewson was founded by Andrew Hewson in the early 1980s. He became interested in computers while working at the British Museum when their first machine arrived. After learning to program, Andrew wrote the programming guide book  Hints and Tips for the ZX80. Following the publication, bedroom coders began to send Andrew the games they had programmed on cassette tape, giving Andrew the idea to publish the games. Hewson Consultants was born, and initially released games via mail order advertisements in computing magazines. Andrew was also a columnist in Sinclair User magazine throughout the 1980s.

Releases
 Space Intruders - 1981 - Space Invaders clone for the ZX81
 Pilot - 1982
 Nightflite - 1982
 Nightflite II - 1983
 Knight Driver - 1983
 Quest Adventure - 1983
 3D Space-Wars - 1983
 3D Seiddab Attack - 1984
 3D Lunattack - 1984 - Reviewed in Crash issue 4 - 90%
 Avalon - 1984 - Reviewed in Crash issue 10 - 91%
 Technician Ted - 1984 - Reviewed in Crash issue 13 - 96%
 Dragontorc - 1985
 Astro Clone - 1985
 Paradroid - 1985
 Gribbly's Day Out - 1985
 Firelord - 1986
 Pyracurse - 1986
 Quazatron - 1986
 Southern Belle - 1986
 Uridium - 1986
 Technician Ted: The Megamix - 1986
 Cybernoid - 1987
 Exolon - 1987
 Zynaps - 1987
 Impossaball - 1987
 Nebulus - 1987
 Ranarama - 1987
 Evening Star - 1987
 Anarchy - 1987
 Netherworld - 1988
 Cybernoid II: The Revenge - 1988
 Marauder - 1988
 Zamzara - 1988
 Eliminator - 1988
 Battle Valley - 1988
 Steel - 1989
 Stormlord - 1989
 Astaroth - 1989
 Onslaught - 1989
 Deliverance - 1990
 Insects in Space - 1990
 Zarathrusta - 1991

Legacy
Andrew and other members of the Hewson management team went on to form 21st Century Entertainment after Hewson shut down in the early 1990s, releasing several games such as Pinball Dreams, Pinball Fantasies and Pinball Illusions. Andrew was also the founder of ELSPA (European Leisure Software Publishers Association) which continues to be the European regulating body for the video games industry.

References

Defunct video game companies of the United Kingdom